Stefan Gradmann (born 22 September 1958 in Marburg) is a professor at KU Leuven and former manager of the University Library.

After studying Philosophy and Literature in Paris and Freiburg and his PhD in 1986 and a post-graduate studies in Cologne, he worked as a research librarian at the State and University Library of Hamburg.

From 1992 to 1996 he was director of the North German library network, and then together with Reiner Diedrichs director of the Common Library Network (GBV). From 1997 to 2000 he worked for the Dutch company OCLC PICA for library software.

Since 2000, he was - later as Deputy Director - Regional Data Center at the University of Hamburg where he led the group employs VCB. Stefan Gradmann was also head of the German Academic Publishers Project (CAP). He is also president of the German Society for Information Science and Practice.

In 2008 he received a professorship at the Institute of Library and Information Science at the Humboldt-Universität zu Berlin where he was responsible for the postgraduate distance learning. In March 2013 he changed to KU Leuven.

Publications
 "Cataloguing vs. Metadata: old wine in new bottles"
 "Towards an implementation model for library catalogs using Semantic Web technology". Cataloging and Classification Quarterly PDF

References

1958 births
Living people
German librarians
People from Marburg